The Cowboy Channel Canada is a Canadian English language licence-exempted specialty channel broadcasting programming dedicated to western sports and the western lifestyle airing programs such as rodeo, bull riding, team roping, reining, barrel racing, and other western sports genres, along with western fashion, music, and movies. The channel is owned by Ryan Kohler through Wild TV Inc.

History

The channel launched on February 1, 2020 on Shaw Direct television systems in high definition through a partnership with Rural Media Group, licensing the brand and majority of its content from its American counterpart, The Cowboy Channel.

References

External links
 The Cowboy Channel Canada website

Television channels and stations established in 2020
Digital cable television networks in Canada
English-language television stations in Canada
HD-only channels
2020 establishments in Canada